Eric Monkman (born ) is a Canadian academic and television personality based in the United Kingdom.

Monkman comes from Oakville, Ontario, Canada. His father, a doctor, died when Eric was thirteen. Monkman obtained his first degree from the University of Waterloo and then studied for a master's degree in economics at Wolfson College, Cambridge, when he captained the college's University Challenge team. The team lost in the 2017 final to a team from Balliol College, Oxford.

His girlfriend, Jiang Na teaches law at Beijing Normal University.  Viewers described him as the most intense contestant ever: a reviewer called him an "unexpected hero".

Television career
Together with Bobby Seagull, Monkman presented the BBC Radio 4 programme Monkman and Seagull’s Polymathic Adventure, and wrote the quiz book The Monkman and Seagull Quiz Book published by Eyewear Publishing in October 2017. They presented Monkman & Seagull's Genius Guide to Britain, a four-part series on BBC Two, first broadcast in 2018. The show was commissioned for a second series in 2019.

References

External links
 

1980s births
Living people
Year of birth missing (living people)
University of Waterloo alumni
Alumni of Wolfson College, Cambridge
Canadian academics
Canadian television hosts
Contestants on University Challenge